Milen Kikarin (born 18 August 1992) is a Bulgarian footballer who plays as a left back.

Career
On 17 June 2016 Kikarin joined Botev Plovdiv. On 30 July 2016 he made an official debut for Botev Plovdiv during the 1-1 draw with the local rivals Lokomotiv Plovdiv.  He was released in January 2017.

On 14 July 2017, Kikarin signed with CSKA 1948.

Honours

Club
CSKA Sofia
 Bulgarian Cup: 2015–16

References

External links
 
 

1992 births
Living people
Bulgarian footballers
PFC CSKA Sofia players
Akademik Sofia players
PFC Pirin Gotse Delchev players
FC Vitosha Bistritsa players
FC Lyubimets players
PFC Minyor Pernik players
Botev Plovdiv players
FC CSKA 1948 Sofia players
FC Sportist Svoge players
First Professional Football League (Bulgaria) players
Second Professional Football League (Bulgaria) players
Association football defenders